Ashley Rheuark is an American sport shooter who took silver medal in the Standard division Lady category at the 2017 IPSC Handgun World Shoot, and silver medal in the Open division Lady category at the 2017 IPSC Rifle World Shoot. She is also USPSA National Champion, ranked as an IDPA Distinguished Master, and has proven herself as a strong competitor in multigun (3-Gun) competitions.

Ashley was introduced to shooting while deer hunting with her dad at the age of 10. In March 2017 she entered team Team Glock only 18 years old.

See also 
 Maria Gushchina, Russian sport shooter
 Lena Miculek, American sport shooter

References 

IPSC shooters
Living people
Year of birth missing (living people)